The 1981 NASCAR Winston Cup Series was the thirty-third season of professional stock car racing in the United States and the 10th modern-era Cup Season. It was the first year of the Gen 3 car. Because of the energy crisis, manufacturers were downsizing their cars to be more fuel-efficient, which NASCAR reflected by mandating a 110-inch wheelbase that still exists today. The season began at Riverside International Raceway with the first Winston Western 500 on January 11, 1981 and ended with the same event on November 22. Darrell Waltrip won his first championship with point margin of fifty-three points over Bobby Allison. Ron Bouchard was named Rookie of the Year.

Teams and drivers

Season schedule and recap

Season summary

Race reports
 Western 500 – The final race where 115-inch wheelbase cars were eligible to run, the field was a mix of 1977 racecars and 1981 models. Dale Earnhardt drove a 1981 Pontiac while race winner Bobby Allison drove a 1977 Monte Carlo. This race was also the first of what would be 788 consecutive Cup series starts for Ricky Rudd.
 Busch Clash - Seven drivers were invited to the 3rd annual Busch Clash for pole winners from 1980. Darrell Waltrip led 13 of 20 laps to win the event, pocketing $71,500 for his 15-minute, 52 second run.
 UNO Twin 125's– The new cars proved to be disturbingly ill-handling and there were several airborne crashes in testing and preliminary events. In the first 125 John Anderson and Connie Saylor flew off the ground and tumbled. Bobby Allison drove a Pontiac LeMans, which unlike the other makes sported a sloped tear glass and was notably more stable. He won the pole and his 125 under yellow for the Saylor crash. Darrell Waltrip in a notch backed Buick engaged in a very spirited duel. Following rookie Tim Richmond’s crash the race ended in a one lap sprint; Benny Parsons stormed from third to the lead but Waltrip re-passed him on the tri-oval apron for the win.
 1981 Daytona 500 Consolation Race - The 12 cars that failed to qualify for the Daytona 500 were allowed to run in a consolation race for 30 laps. This was the first time there was a consolation race since 1962. Lake Speed led all 30 laps to win and take home $5,000.
 Daytona 500- NASCAR increased spoiler size twice during the week to keep the cars on the ground. The ensuing 500 saw only four minor cautions and 49 lead changes. Bobby Allison’s 1981 Pontiac LeMans was as expected from Thursday more stable and faster, but Richard Petty got out to the lead after his last pitstop by not changing tires; once in the lead he was uncatchable by Allison as he took his seventh and final Daytona 500 win.
 Richmond 400– Darrell Waltrip drove Junior Johnson's Buick to his first win of the season, edging Ricky Rudd, driving Waltrip's former car, the DiGard Oldsmobile. Bobby Allison wrecked his Pontiac LeMans and drove Butch Lindley's car rather than run a backup Oldsmobile in the team's shop for fear NASCAR would use the existence of the backup to justify banning the LeMans altogether.
 Carolina 500 - Cale Yarborough won the pole and led 320 laps but ran dry in the final 25 laps. Richard Petty led until three laps to go as Darrell Waltrip outlasted the field to win. The lead changed a track-record 36 times. This was the last race that Richard Petty would lead the Winston Cup points standings in his career. ESPN made their NASCAR broadcasting debut.
 Atlanta 500 – Team owner Harry Ranier protested NASCAR-mandated spoiler reduction to the Pontiac LeMans the team was running but got no support from rival teams. Cale Yarborough edged Harry Gant for the win while Dave Marcis flipped violently after sliding hard into a mammoth truck tire shielding the pit wall abutment.
 Southeastern 500 - Waltrip led 323 laps and edged Ricky Rudd for the win, his third of the season. There were eight caution flags, one of them involving a hard set-to between Benny Parsons and Joe Millikan. "I admit I lost my cool," Millikan said, to which team owner Bud Moore replied, "I'll straighten out Millikan's cool."
 Rebel 500 – Waltrip edged Gant, who was making his debut in a Pontiac Grand Prix owned by Burt Reynolds and Hal Needham. Bobby Allison debuted a new Buick as the team gave up on the LeMans because of NASCAR spoiler reduction on the car.
 Virginia 500– Rookie Morgan Shepherd dominated en route to his first career Grand National win.
 Winston 500 – Allison slugged it out with Waltrip, Rudd, and Buddy Baker en route to a wild last-lap win.
 Melling Tool 420 - Ricky Rudd in the DiGard No. 88 and Benny Parsons in the Bud Moore No. 15 bearing the race sponsor's colors led 419 of 420 laps; only Darrell Waltrip broke this duopoly. Waltrip futilely chased Parsons over the final 84 laps as Parsons grabbed his first win with Bud Moore.
 Mason-Dixon 500 - David Pearson won the pole in the Kenny Childers No. 12 and led the first 41 laps before falling out with engine failure. Neil Bonnett in the Wood Brothers No. 21 led 404 laps but blew up with 41 laps to go; twenty laps later Cale Yarborough blew his engine and this left Jody Ridley effectively alone to the checkered. It was Ridley's only Winston Cup win, coming in his 55th start, and it was the only Cup win for team owner Junie Donlavey.
 World 600 – Allison won in a crash-torn race in which his brother Donnie suffered a serious leg injury.
 Budweiser 400 - Benny Parsons and Dale Earnhardt squared off in a hard-fought race as the lead changed 35 official times, the most in Texas World Speedway's history. Parsons edged Earnhardt after five lead changes between them in the final eleven laps. The 1981 race proved to be the final major stock car race at the troubled Texas superspeedway until Ishin Speed Sport took it over ten years later.
 Warner W. Hodgdon 400 - Waltrip got back to victory in a four-car scramble with Earnhardt, Petty, and Bonnett. Crashes eliminated Bobby Allison, rookies Tim Richmond and Morgan Shepherd, and James Hylton.
 Gabriel 400 – After 50 lead changes Bobby Allison was running seventh when Kyle Petty's blown engine sent four of the top six in the field into the Turn Two guardrail, while race leaders Dale Earnhardt and Darrell Waltrip crashed before Turn Three. The win put Allison nearly 300 points ahead of Waltrip in the standings. Following the race Earnhardt's team owner Rod Osterlund sold the team to J. D. Stacy.
 Firecracker 400 - Bobby Allison has taken a 256-point lead over Darrell Waltrip but after burning a valve and finishing 28th his point lead fell to 206. Cale Yarborough won the pole and led 78 laps while Harry Gant led 43 laps; Gant took the lead on Lap 138 but Cale stormed past for the win on the final lap. Dale Earnhardt led the opening lap in the first race with J. D. Stacy as new owner of the former Rod Osterlund Pontiac, but fell out with a vibration after 71 laps.
 Busch Nashville 420 - Waltrip led 303 laps and edged Allison for the win, with May winner Benny Parsons third. Rookie Mark Martin, a star in American Speed Association stockers, won the pole and led the opening 36 laps.
 Mountain Dew 500 - Six years after the 1975 Purolator 500 and the controversial win by a Purolator-sponsored car, Darrell Waltrip's Buick with the race's sponsor took the win amid controversy. Cale Yarborough fell a lap down but got it back, but he pitted too early on a late yellow and lost the lap again. He stormed past Richard Petty on a last-lap restart thinking he was the leader, and Waltrip took the lead from Petty for the win. Yarborough initially protested the outcome thinking he was on the lead lap, but NASCAR score cards showed Waltrip indeed was the leader.
 Talladega 500 – Bobby Allison led the most laps but slipped back in the final laps, leaving Darrell Waltrip, Terry Labonte, and rookie Ron Bouchard in contention for the win. On the final lap in Talladega's trioval, Labonte swung high on Waltrip and as the two jostled, Bouchard dove to the bottom and beat them to the stripe by inches. Bouchard's victory is considered by many to be the biggest upset in NASCAR history.
 Champion Spark Plug 400 – Richard Petty stormed past five cars with five laps to go and held off Waltrip and Ricky Rudd in the most competitive race of the season (65 lead changes, a still-standing record for Michigan International Speedway, among 14 drivers).
 Southern 500 - Neil Bonnett led 216 laps and edged Darrell Waltrip by one car length; Waltrip's runner-up finish pulled him to within 18 points of Bobby Allison.
 Wrangler Sanfor-Set 400 - Benny Parsons scores his 20th and penultimate victory in the Cup Series. Bobby Allison finishes fifth leading 95 laps but Darrell Waltrip finishes third leading the most laps at 149 which cuts Allison's lead down to 3 points.
 Delaware 500 - Neil Bonnett put the entire field a lap down as he led 185 laps en route to his second win in three races. Darrell Waltrip beat Bobby Allison for second and thus took the point lead by 2 points over Allison.
 Old Dominion 500 - Harry Gant led the most laps at 253 but faltered as Darrell Waltrip grabbed the lead with 36 laps to go; Waltrip's win was the first of four straight. Waltrip padded his lead by 41 points to lead Allison by 43 points.
 Holly Farms 400 - Darrell Waltrip wins his second straight race while leading the most laps at 318. Bobby Allison finished second leading seventy six laps. Waltrip padded his lead by 10 points to lead Allison by 53 points.
 National 500 - Neil Bonnett dominates leading 135 of the races first 190 laps but then before he can complete lap 191 his engine expires, leaving Darrell Waltrip to battle with Bobby Allison for the rest of the race in which Waltrip prevails, winning his third straight race while padding his points lead by 5 to lead over Allison by 58 points.
 American 500 - Waltrip and Allison fought for the win as the lead changed between them during the final 19 laps; with his fourth straight win Waltrip increased his point lead by 10 points to lead Allison by 68 points.
 Atlanta Journal 500 - ESPN broadcast the race live, the first such NASCAR broadcast for the third-year cable network, with Mike Joy, Larry Nuber, and Ned Jarrett handling the broadcast duty. The race was a hard-fought affair as Neil Bonnett battled Richard Petty, Joe Ruttman, and Harry Gant; Waltrip cut a tire in mid-race but battled and got his lap back; he rallied and took the lead at the white flag, but Bonnett stormed to the win while Waltrip padded his points lead by 15 points to lead Allison headed to the season finale at Riverside by 83 points.
 Winston Western 500 - For the first time in the modern era the series visited the same track three times in a season. This would not happen again until the COVID-19 pandemic occurred and forced NASCAR to make schedule changes due to a combination of local, state, and federal travel restrictions and limits on social gatherings. This race featured a great battle for the win between Allison and Ruttman for the last 20 laps. Bobby passed Joe with 9 laps to go and Ruttman got back alongside Allison several times but was never able to complete the pass. Allison did what he needed to do by winning the race and leading the most laps at 49. It was however not enough as Darrell Waltrip won his first championship by leading 1 lap & finishing in 6th place to beat Allison by 53 points.

Final point standings

(key) Bold – Pole position awarded by time. Italics – Pole position set by owner's points. * – Most laps led.

Source:

Earnhardt drove races 1–20 in the No. 2 Rod Osterlund Wrangler Jeans Pontiac Grand Prix but left the team when Osterlund sold it to J. D. Stacy. He finished the season driving for Richard Childress in the No. 3 Wrangler Pontiac Grand Prix.

References

External links
 Winston Cup Standings and Statistics for 1981

 

NASCAR Cup Series seasons